Amanda Agestav (born 26 January 1974 in Västerås) is a Swedish Christian Democrat politician.  She was a member of the Riksdag from the constituency Stockholms län from 1998 to 2002.

She was appointed municipal commissioner in Västerås following the 2018 election.

References

1974 births
Living people
Members of the Riksdag from the Christian Democrats (Sweden)
Women members of the Riksdag
Members of the Riksdag 1998–2002
21st-century Swedish women politicians
Municipal commissioners of Sweden